The 1982 Tasmanian state election was held on 15 May 1982.

Retiring Members

Liberal
Robert Mather MLA (Denison)

House of Assembly
Sitting members are shown in bold text. Tickets that elected at least one MHA are highlighted in the relevant colour. Successful candidates are indicated by an asterisk (*).

Bass
Seven seats were up for election. The Labor Party was defending four seats, although Mary Willey had left the party to sit as an independent. The Liberal Party was defending three seats.

Braddon
Seven seats were up for election. The Labor Party was defending four seats. The Liberal Party was defending three seats.

Denison
Seven seats were up for election. The Labor Party was defending three seats. The Liberal Party was defending three seats. The Australian Democrats were defending one seat.

Franklin
Seven seats were up for election. The Labor Party was defending four seats, although former Premier Doug Lowe had left the party to sit as an independent. The Liberal Party was defending three seats.

Wilmot
Seven seats were up for election. The Labor Party was defending four seats. The Liberal Party was defending three seats.

See also
 Members of the Tasmanian House of Assembly, 1979–1982
 Members of the Tasmanian House of Assembly, 1982–1986

References
Tasmanian Parliamentary Library

Candidates for Tasmanian state elections